Drum Theatre were a British pop group, active in the mid-1980s. The band released four singles and one album, after which they disbanded.

In 2013, the label Cherry Red Records published a remastered version of the original album, Everyman. The remastered album included six additional tracks.

Discography

Singles
 "Eldorado" (1985) – European number 1, UK number 44, ITA number 2, NL number 13
 "Living in the Past" (1985) – UK number 67, ITA number 25
 "Home (Is Where the Heart Is)" (1986) ITA number 27, UK number 91
 "Moving Targets" (1987)

Albums
 Everyman (1986)
 Everyman (2013) (Remastered version)

References

External links
 Drum Theatre entry at Discogs

English pop music groups
Musical groups established in 1985
Musical groups disestablished in 1987
1985 establishments in England
1987 disestablishments in England